The Mayor (lit. "Special Citizen") is a 2017 South Korean political drama film written and directed by Park In-je. It stars Choi Min-sik, Kwak Do-won, Shim Eun-kyung, Moon So-ri, Ra Mi-ran, Ryu Hye-young, and Ki Hong Lee. The film was released in South Korea on April 26, 2017 and in the US and Canada on April 28.

Premise
Byeon Jong-gu, the incumbent mayor of Seoul, seeks a third term which will set him up for a run at the presidency. As the election campaign gets underway, Byeon employs all ways and means to keep his darkest secrets hidden from his adoring public. Wiretapping, corruption, murder—everything is on the table and no one is safe.

Cast

Main 
 Choi Min-sik as Byeon Jong-gu, two-term incumbent Seoul mayor
 Kwak Do-won as Shim Hyeok-soo, Byeon's campaign manager
 Shim Eun-kyung as Park Kyeong, advertisement specialist

Supporting 
 Moon So-ri as Jung Jae-yi, political journalist
 Ra Mi-ran as Yang Jin-joo, Byeon's election opponent 
 Ryu Hye-young as Im Min-seon, Yang's aide  
 Jin Seon-kyu as Chauffeur
 Seo Yi-sook as Byeon Jong-gu's wife
 Park Byung-eun as Byeon Jong-gu's staff
 Kim Hong-fa as Kim Nak-hyun
 Park Hyuk-kwon as Gye Bong-sik 
 Kim Su-an as Yoon-hak
 Lee Soo-kyung as Byun A-reum 
 Park Bo-kyung as Gil-soo's wife
 Han Da-sol as Yang Camp Media Team member
 Jo Han-chul as Yang Jin-Joo's campaign manager 
 Kim Hye-eun as Seoul debate moderator

Special appearance 
 Ki Hong Lee as Steve, Yang Jin-joo's son
 Lee Geung-young as Jeong Chi-in 
 Ma Dong-seok as Priest

Production
Filming commenced on April 28, 2016 and wrapped four months later.

Writer-director Park In-je began working on the script in 2014. Park said the film was not made to focus on the dark side of political elections, but as a means to shed light on human's "unremitting desire for power". The film also marks star Choi Min-sik's second time ever to portray a politician after 1995's MBC TV series The Fourth Republic, in which he played late President Kim Dae-jung. Unlike The Fourth Republic, the character of Byeon in The Mayor was not modeled after a particular politician. Choi said: "I embodied the character by synthesizing all the images that I had about politicians… Up until [shooting the film], I had never been directly engaged in politics or met closely with politicians… After trying to think of the image of politicians, I concluded that speech is the most important skill for them. Politicians rise and fall from the words they used. So I decided to focus on having a good command of language when playing Byeon Jong-gu".

Release
 The Mayor was released on 1,152 screens in South Korea on April 26, 2017. It topped the box office on its opening day, with 185,776 tickets sold. During its opening weekend, it earned $6.1 million from 904,000 admissions over five days ranking first at the box office.

The film was released in the US and Canada on April 28, 2017 and was distributed by Well Go USA.

Awards and nominations

References

External links

The Mayor at Naver Movies 

2017 films
2010s Korean-language films
South Korean political drama films
Films about elections
2010s political drama films
Showbox films
2017 drama films
2010s South Korean films